The 1904 Southern Intercollegiate Athletic Association football season was the college football games played by the member schools of the Southern Intercollegiate Athletic Association as part of the 1904 college football season. The season began on September 24 with conference member Sewanee hosting the Mooney School.

1904 saw new coaches Mike Donahue at Auburn and Dan McGugin at Vanderbilt, both of which posted undefeated conference records. McGugin remains the only coach in NCAA history to win his first three games by 60 points.  Both McGugin and Donahue were inaugural inductees into the College Football Hall of Fame. The SIAA forbade a postseason contest between Auburn and Vanderbilt.

Also significantly, John Heisman was hired at Georgia Tech.

Season overview

Results and team statistics

Key

PPG = Average of points scored per game
PAG = Average of points allowed per game

Regular season

SIAA teams in bold.

Week One

Week Two

Week Three

Week Four

Week Five

Week Six

Week Seven

Week Eight

Week Nine

Week Ten

Week Eleven

All-Southern team

The composite All-Southern  team compiled by John de Saulles included:

References